is a Japanese actress and a gravure idol. She won the title of "Miss Young Magazine" in 1996.

Personal life 
She has been married to actor Tōru Kusano since March 5, 2008. On December 29, 2012, she gave birth to a son.

Filmography

Television 
 Moon Spiral (NTV / 1996) - Chihiro Yatsumata
 Ultraman Dyna (Tsuburaya Productions / 1997-1998) - Mai Midorikawa
 Naniwa Shōnen Tanteidan (NHK / 2000) - Shinobu Takeuchi
 Ranpo R (YTV / 2004) - ep.5
 Seven Female Lawyers 2 (TV Asahi / 2008)

Movies 
 Ultraman Tiga & Ultraman Dyna | Urutoraman Tiga & Urutoraman Daina: Hikari no hoshi no senshi tachi (1998) - Super GUTS Member Mai Midorikawa
 Ultraman Tiga: The Final Odyssey (1999) - Mai Midorikawa (cameo)
 Ultraman Mebius & Ultraman Brothers (2006)- journalist

TV movies 
 The Files of Young Kindaichi: Murder on the Magic Express (NTV / 2001)
 Gate of Flesh | Nikutai no Mon (TV Asahi / 2008)

References

External links 
 Official blog 
 

1980 births
Living people
People from Nagoya
Actors from Aichi Prefecture
Japanese television personalities
Japanese gravure models
Japanese actresses